Sergiy Timofeyevich Shevchenko (October 5, 1908, in Makiyivka, Donetsk region – 200?, in Kyiv) was a Ukrainian politician and diplomat who served as the Permanent Representative of Ukraine to the United Nations.

Education 
Sergiy Shevchenko graduated from the Kharkiv Institute of National Economy, and the Institute of Red Professors in 1937.

Professional career and experience 
 In 1937 he was heading department of executive cadres in People's Commissariat of Education of the Ukrainian SSR. 
 In 1941 - he entered military service in Red Army. 
 In 194?–1946 - Deputy Chief Political Officer in the 3rd Guards Tank Army.
 In 1946 - he worked in the Kyiv Regional Committee of the Communist Party of Ukraine. 
 In 1964 to 1968 - he was permanent representative of the Ukrainian Soviet Socialist Republic to the United Nations.
 In 1968, after an unsuccessful press conference to mark the 50th anniversary of the Ukrainian SSR, Sergei Shevchenko left New York City.

References

External links 
 Chronicle: Ukraine to the United Nations
 Handbook of the history of the Communist Party and the Soviet Union 1898 - 1991
 UNITED NATIONS SECURITY COUNCIL OFFICIAL RECORDS THIRTY-NINTH YEAR 2542nd MEETING: 25 MAY 1984 NEW YORK
 Diplomacy in the Former Soviet Republics James P. Nichol Greenwood Publishing Group, 1.01.1995 - 244.
 Ukraine's U.N. Mission celebrates 40th anniversary

1908 births
2000s deaths
People from Makiivka
Kharkiv National University of Economics alumni
Permanent Representatives of Ukraine to the United Nations
Communist Party of Ukraine (Soviet Union) politicians